Migo Dam  is a gravity dam located in Hiroshima Prefecture in Japan. The dam is used for irrigation. The catchment area of the dam is 6.3 km2. The dam impounds about 22  ha of land when full and can store 1660 thousand cubic meters of water. The construction of the dam was started on 1991 and completed in 2003.

References

Dams in Hiroshima Prefecture